Kaura (Tyap: Watyap) is a town and a Local Government Area in southern Kaduna State, Nigeria. Its headquarters are in the town of Kaura in Asholyio (Moroa) Chiefdom. The Local Government Council is chaired by Matthias Siman. Other towns include: Manchok and Kagoro. It has an area of 461 km and a population of 174,626 at the 2006 census. The postal code of the area is 801.

Boundaries
Kaura (Watyap) Local Government Area shares boundaries with Zangon Kataf Local Government Area to the west, Kauru Local Government Area to the north, Jema'a Local Government Area to the south and Plateau State to the east, respectively.

Administrative subdivisions
Kaura Local Government Area consists of 10 subdivisions (second-order administrative divisions) or electoral wards, namely:
Agban
Bondong (Gbandang)
Fada (Ucyio)
Kadarko
Kaura (Watyap)
Kpak
Kukum
Malagum (Zali)
Manchok (Tsok)
Zankan

Population
Kaura Local Government Area according to the March 21, 2006 national population census was put at 174,626. Its population was projected by the National Population Commission of Nigeria and National Bureau of Statistics to be 235,700 by March 21, 2016.

People
The people of Kaura Local Government Area are homogenous, belonging to the larger Atyap (Nienzit) Ethno-Linguistic Cluster. These people include the A̱sholyia̱ (also spelt Osholio, Æsholio, A̠sholyio), 'Moro'a' in Hausa language, A̱gworok (also spelt Œgworok), also known as 'Kagoro' in Hausa language, Takad as well as the A̱tyeca̱rak also known as 'Kachechere' in Hausa language, and Atyap Proper, also known as 'Kataf' in Hausa language.

Languages
The people of Kaura Local Government Area speak five inter-related dialectical varieties of the Tyap language, namely: Sholyia̱ (also spelt Sholio), Gworok, Takad (also spelt Takat), Tyeca̱rak and Tyap Proper. Kaura Local government was carved out from Jema'a local government area by the past military government of Kaduna state and it shares boundary with Plateau state, blessed with beautiful mountainous environment and good weather.

Religion
The people are mostly Christians (above 95%) and a very minute percent are Abwoi adherents and Muslims.

Traditional States
There are three Nigerian traditional states headed by three Agwams (monarchs):
The Gworok (Kagoro) Chiefdom, headed by Agwam Ufuwai Bonet (OON), Agwam Agworok (also ''Oegwam Oegworok).
The Asholyio (Moroa) Chiefdom, headed by A̠gwam Tagwai Sambo (OFR), Agwam Asholyio.
The Takad Chiefdom, headed by Agwam Tobias Nkom Wada, Agwam Takad.

Notable people
 Agwam (Dr.) Gwamna Awan (MBE, OON), paramount ruler
 Arch. Barnabas Bala Bantex, architect, politician
 Agwam (Dr.) Ufuwai Bonet (CON), paramount ruler
 Pst. Chris Delvan Gwamna, singer, clergy
 Sen. Danjuma Laah, politician
 Maj. Gen. Joshua Madaki, military service
 Prof. Andrew Nkom
 Agwam Tagwai Sambo (OFR), paramount ruler
 Sen. Nenadi Esther Usman, politician
 Hon. Gideon Gwani, (minority whip) Federal House of Representatives.

References

External links

Local Government Areas in Kaduna State